Siah Gurab-e Bala (also Romanized as Sīāh Gūrāb-e Bālā) is a village in Layalestan Rural District, in the Central District of Lahijan County, Gilan Province, Iran. At the 2006 census, its population was 211, in 82 families.

References 

Populated places in Lahijan County